Acronicta edolata is a moth of the family Noctuidae. It is found in North America, including Arizona.

External links
Image

Acronicta
Moths of North America
Moths described in 1881